"Protection" is a song written by Bruce Springsteen for Donna Summer. It was originally featured on Summer's 1982 self-titled album which was produced by Quincy Jones. In 1997 it was also included on  One Step Up/Two Steps Back: The Songs Of Bruce Springsteen. It was released as a single in Belgium and Japan and was nominated for a Grammy Award as Best Female Rock Vocal Performance alongside Linda Ronstadt, Pat Benatar, Bonnie Raitt, and Kim Carnes.

David Geffen approached Jon Landau, Springsteen's manager and producer, and asked if Springsteen would be interested in writing a song for Summer. Summer had just recently signed for Geffen Records. Springsteen agreed to write a song and, while working with Gary U.S. Bonds, he gathered the E Street Band to record a demo. However, when Landau heard the result, "Cover Me", he persuaded Springsteen to keep that song for himself. Springsteen then wrote "Protection".  He recorded a version with the E Street Band at The Hit Factory during January or February 1982 and registered it at the United States Copyright Office on March 8, 1982. In the same month Springsteen and Roy Bittan also travelled to Los Angeles to help record Summer's version of the song.  Bruce and Donna allegedly also recorded a duet vocal version at her sessions but it remains unreleased. On the released version by Summer, Springsteen played the guitar solo and can clearly be heard on fadeout vocals. Springsteen's own version of the song was seriously considered for Born in the USA, however it remains unreleased. He has performed the song in concert and can be found on YouTube.   The song peak No. 26 in Spain Radio chart.

Personnel

Musicians
 Donna Summer – lead vocals, cody
 Bruce Springsteen – guitar solo, backing vocals
 Ernie Watts – saxophones
 Steve Lukather – guitars
 David Paich – synthesizers
 Greg Phillinganes – synthesizers
 Roy Bittan – acoustic piano
 Louis Johnson – bass
 Jeff Porcaro – drums
 Steve Porcaro – synthesizer programming

Production
 Quincy Jones  – producer
 Bruce Swedien – engineer, mixing

References

1982 singles
Donna Summer songs
Bruce Springsteen songs
Songs written by Bruce Springsteen
Song recordings produced by Quincy Jones
1982 songs